The 2009–10 Azerbaijan First Division, also known as the Birinci Dästä, is the second-level of football in Azerbaijan. Twelve teams participated in Azerbaijani First Division that season. The season began on 5 September 2009 and finished on 16 May 2010.

Teams

Stadia and locations
Note: Table lists in alphabetical order.

League table

Top goalscorers
Including matches played on 17 May 2010; Source:
14 goals
  Zaur Mammadov (MOIK Baku)
  Ibrahim Huseynov (FK Ganca)
10 goals
  Fuad Aliyev (Bakili Baku)
  Rafig Kochaliyev (MKT Araz)

See also
 2009–10 Azerbaijan Premier League
 2009–10 Azerbaijan Cup

References

External links
 pfl.az
 AFFA 

Azerbaijan First Division seasons
2009–10 in Azerbaijani football
Azer